Claude Silberzahn (18 March 1935 – 18 April 2020) was a French high civil servant.

Silberzahn was Prefect of French Guiana (1982–84), of Seine-Maritime (1985-86, with jurisdiction over the region of Haute-Normandie) and Doubs (1986–89, with jurisdiction over the region of Franche-Comté).

He was Director-General of DGSE, the French external intelligence agency, from 23 March 1989 to 7 June 1993.

He was mayor of Simorre, a village in Gers department, from 2001 to 2014.

He died on 18 April 2020.

References

External links
 Brigitte Henri, Histoire secrète des RG
 Claude Silberzahn's Acteurs publics biography (via Europresse)

1935 births
2020 deaths
École nationale de la France d'Outre-Mer alumni
Prefects of French Guiana
Prefects of Doubs
Prefects of Seine-Maritime
Judges of the Court of Audit (France)
French people of German descent
Directors of the Directorate-General for External Security
Mayors of places in Occitania (administrative region)
People from Mulhouse